Plínio Osvaldo Fonseca Brito, known as Pinha (born 5 August 1972) is a former Cape Verdean football player. He also holds Portuguese citizenship.

Club career
He made his professional debut in the Segunda Liga for Académico de Viseu on 12 January 1992 in a game against Portimonense.

He made his Primeira Liga debut for União de Leiria on 1 September 1996, when he played the whole game in a 0–3 loss to Leça.

References

1972 births
Living people
Cape Verdean footballers
Liga Portugal 2 players
Académico de Viseu F.C. players
C.D. Tondela players
U.D. Leiria players
Portimonense S.C. players
CD Ourense footballers
C.D.R. Quarteirense players
S.C. Pombal players
G.D. Sourense players
G.D. Tourizense players
Primeira Liga players
S.L. Benfica (Luanda) players
Cape Verdean expatriate footballers
Expatriate footballers in Spain
Cape Verdean expatriate sportspeople in Spain
Expatriate footballers in Angola
Cape Verdean expatriate sportspeople in Angola
Association football midfielders